Detroit Dogshit is a compilation album by the rapper Esham. Released in 1997, it is the first compilation album by the rapper, and contains tracks from Esham's albums and extended plays from the years 1989–1994.

Track listing

References

1997 greatest hits albums
Albums produced by Esham
Esham compilation albums
Horrorcore compilation albums
Reel Life Productions compilation albums